Quizmaster can refer to:

 Quizmaster (game show), a 2002 game show produced by the Seven Network
 Temptation Quizmaster (game show), the 2006 series on Nine Network's Temptation
 Quizmaster (DC Comics) an alternate universe superhero version of the Riddler
 Game show host, a quizmaster on a broadcast program